Ulvi Uraz (13 February 1921 – 25 May 1974) was a Turkish theater and film actor and director.

Partial filmography

 Zümrüt (1959) - Ziya
 Tütün Zamanı (1959) - Bekir
 Kalpaklilar (1960)
 Denize inen sokak (1960) - Ali
 Civanmert (1960)
 Özleyis (1961)
 Tintin and the Golden Fleece (1961) - Malik
 Rüzgar Zehra (1961)
 Naylon Leyla (1961)
 Kabadayilar krali (1961)
 Günes dogmasin (1961)
 Aşk Hırsızı (1961)
 Sehvet uçurumu (1962)
 Mevlid (1962)
 Kelle koltukta (1962)
 Geçti buranin pazari (1962)
 Sahte nikah (1962)
 Kismetin en güzeli (1962)
 Rüzgarli tepe (1963)
 Menekse gözler (1963)
 Leyla ile Mecnun gibi (1963)
 Kâmil Abi (1963) - Kâmil Abi
 Disi kurt (1963) - Deli Haydar Reis
 Bir hizmetçi kizin hatira defteri (1963) 
 Azrailin habercisi (1963)
 Dilberler yuvasi (1963)
 L'Immortelle (1963) - Antique Dealer
 Yakilacak kitap (1963)
 Son tren (1964)
 Manyaklar köskü (1964)
 Gel barisalim (1964)
 Yarın Bizimdir (1964) - Naci Kahraman
 Hostes hanim (1964)
 Döner Ayna (1964)
 Göklerdeki Sevgili (1966) - (final film role)

External links
 

1921 births
1974 deaths
Turkish male film actors
Turkish film directors
20th-century Turkish male actors
Burials at Aşiyan Asri Cemetery